Lukáš Sadílek (born 23 May 1996) is a professional Czech football midfielder currently playing for Sparta Prague in the Czech First League.

Career
He made his career league debut for Slovácko on 30 August 2014 in a Czech First League 4–1 home win against Sigma Olomouc. He went on loan to Baník Sokolov in the second tier of Czech football in 2016. The loan was then extended for the remainder of the 2016–17 season.

Personal life
His brother Michal is also a professional footballer.

References

External links 
 
 Lukáš Sadílek official international statistics

Czech footballers
1996 births
Living people
Czech First League players
1. FC Slovácko players
People from Uherské Hradiště
Association football midfielders
Sportspeople from the Zlín Region
FK Baník Sokolov players
Czech National Football League players
AC Sparta Prague players
Czech Republic youth international footballers
Czech Republic under-21 international footballers